The 1919 Indiana Hoosiers football team was an American football team that represented the Indiana Hoosiers during the 1919 college football season In their fourth season under head coach Ewald O. Stiehm, the Hoosiers compiled a 3–4 record and finished in ninth place in the Big Ten Conference. They won games against  (20–7), Kentucky (24–0), and Syracuse (12–6), and lost games to national champion Centre (12–3), Minnesota (20–6), Notre Dame (16–3), and Northwestern (3–2).

Schedule

References

Indiana
Indiana Hoosiers football seasons
Indiana Hoosiers football